The Social Welfare functional constituency, formerly called Social Services, is a functional constituency in the elections for the Legislative Council of Hong Kong. The constituency was first created as one of the original 12 functional constituency seats for the first ever Legislative Council election in 1985.

It is one of the functional constituencies with the most electorates. As of 2021, there were 13,974 registered voters, including all the social workers registered under the Social Workers Registration Ordinance. It had also been one of the few functional constituencies held by the pro-democrats before 2021.

Return members

Social Services (1988–1995)

Social Welfare (1995–present)

Electoral results

2020s

2010s

2000s

1990s

1980s

References

Constituencies of Hong Kong
Constituencies of Hong Kong Legislative Council
Functional constituencies (Hong Kong)
1985 establishments in Hong Kong
Constituencies established in 1985